Saint Randoald (also Rancald, Randaut, d. 21 February 675) was prior of the Benedictine Moutier-Grandval Abbey (in modern-day Switzerland) under Germanus of Granfelden.

Passio sancti Germani
The Passio sancti Germani recounts the death of Saint Randoald and appears in the eleventh century "Codex of Saint-Gall". It was written about 695 by Bobolène, a priest of Luxeuil Abbey at the request of the religious brothers Chadoal and Aridius, contemporaries of Randoald.

Death
He was martyred together with Germanus by partisans of the Duke of Alsace, Eticho. The monk and his abbot stood up for the region's poor against Eticho's efforts to subdue the inhabitants of the region around Delémont. Randoald had accompanied Abbot Germanus to the Church of Saint Maurice in Courtételle where the abbot remonstrated with the duke regarding his depredations in the area. The monastics had just left after negotiations with the duke and were returning to Moutier-Grandval. One of the duke's lieutenants with a few men set off in pursuit. they caught up with them and executed them, one of the soldiers cutting Randoald's head off, while Germanus was pierced with a spear.

Veneration
The following night the religious collected the bodies and buried them first in Saint-Ursanne, then in Moutier-Granval. 

They are both venerated as saints in the Catholic Church. Miracles reportedly took place at their tomb, which became a center of pilgrimage. The remains of the martyrs were in 1477 transferred under the high altar. Their cult extended throughout the diocese of Basel and throughout the province of Besancon. The relics of the abbey were taken to the Church of Saint-Marcel in Delémont at the Reformation; the church still has the bodies of Saints Germanus and Randoald, where they continue to be venerated. 

Their joint feast day is 21 February, the anniversary of their deaths.

References

External links
 Germanus and Randoald story at Kirchensite.de
 Germanus and Randoald story at Abbaye Saint Benoît

675 deaths
Roman Catholic saints
Benedictines
7th-century Christian saints
Year of birth unknown